Miryang No,  is one of the Korean clans, with its Bon-gwan related to Miryang, South Gyeongsang Province, South Korea.

Genealogy
The clan's founder was Lu Zhonglian who belonged to the Qi (state) and is recorded to have been active during the Spring and Autumn period, China. As per Guanglin (2014), "...the Hamyŏl-Namgung clan, T'aean-Kyŏng clan, Ponghwa-Kŭm clan, Miryang-No clan, T'osan-Kung clan, and others are said to descend from followers of Kija. The founders of these five clans were all men of the Koryŏ dynasty."

According to the year 2000 census conducted by the Korean National Statistical Office, the size of the Miryang No clan was 1268.

Notes

See also 
 Korean clan names of foreign origin

References

External links 
 

Korean clan names of Chinese origin

No clans